Liviu Naghy (November 20, 1929 in Oradea – 1989) was a Romanian basketball player who competed in the 1952 Summer Olympics.

He was part of the Romanian basketball team, which was eliminated in the first round of the 1952 tournament. He played both matches.

References

1929 births
1989 deaths
Basketball players at the 1952 Summer Olympics
Olympic basketball players of Romania
Sportspeople from Oradea
Romanian men's basketball players